Conrad Albinus Nervig (June 24, 1889 – November 26, 1980) was an American film editor with 81 film credits.

He began work in 1922 at Goldwyn Pictures, and remained with the studio after its merger to form Metro-Goldwyn-Mayer (MGM) in 1924. He spent essentially his entire career at MGM, retiring from the studio in 1954.

Nervig was the first recipient of the Academy Award for Film Editing for the film Eskimo (1933). He won a second "Oscar" (shared with Ralph E. Winters) for the film King Solomon's Mines (1950). He was also nominated for his work on A Tale of Two Cities (1935).

Filmography

Winners of the Wilderness (1927)
Rookies (1927)
The Fair Co-Ed (1927)
The Divine Woman (1928)
The Actress (1928)
The Masks of the Devil (1928)
The Wind (1928)
Wild Orchids (1929)
The Idle Rich (1929)
The Last of Mrs. Cheyney (1929)
Devil-May-Care (1929)
Die Sehnsucht Jeder Frau (1930)
A Lady to Love (1930)
Call of the Flesh (1930)
Passion Flower (1930)
Le procès de Mary Dugan (1931)
Buster se marie (1931)
Inspiration (1931)
Son of India (1931)
The Guardsman (1931)
Private Lives (1931)
Letty Lynton (1932)
Downstairs (1932)
Kongo (1932)
The Women in His Life (1933)
Eskimo (1934)
Paris Interlude (1934)
The Night Is Young (1935)
The Casino Murder Case (1935)
Murder in the Fleet (1935)
Calm Yourself (1935)
A Tale of Two Cities (1935)
Exclusive Story (1936)
Absolute Quiet (1936)
Women Are Trouble (1936)
His Brother's Wife (1936)
Maytime (1937)
The Emperor's Candlesticks (1937)
Live, Love and Learn (1937)
Beg, Borrow or Steal (1937)
Love Is a Headache (1938)
The First Hundred Years (1938)
The Crowd Roars (1938)
Spring Madness (1938)
Honolulu (1939)
Sergeant Madden (1939)
6,000 Enemies (1939)
Henry Goes Arizona (1939)
Northwest Passage (1940)
The Man from Dakota (1940)
And One Was Beautiful (1940)
Phantom Raiders (1940)
The Golden Fleecing (1940)
Hullabaloo (1940)
The Bad Man (1941)
The Big Store (1941)
Dr. Kildare's Wedding Day (1941)
The Omaha Trail (1942)
I Married an Angel (1942)
Kathleen (1942)
Grand Central Murder (1942)
The Human Comedy (1943)
An American Romance (1944)
Nothing but Trouble (1945)
Courage of Lassie (1946)
No Leave, No Love (1946)
High Barbaree (1947)
High Wall (1948)
Act of Violence (1949)
Border Incident (1949)
Side Street (1949)
Devil's Doorway (1950)
King Solomon's Mines (1950)
Vengeance Valley (1951)
Too Young to Kiss(1951)The Merry Widow (1952)The Bad and the Beautiful (1953)The Affairs of Dobie Gillis (1953)Gypsy Colt (1954)Death of a Scoundrel'' (1956)

References

1889 births
1980 deaths
Best Film Editing Academy Award winners
People from Grant County, South Dakota
American film editors